Mount Samat is a mountain in the town of Pilar, Bataan, Philippines. Located near its summit is the Mount Samat National Shrine, a national shrine dedicated to the fallen Filipino and American fallen during World War II.

Geology
Mount Samat is a parasitic cone of Mount Mariveles with no record of historical eruption. The summit of Mount Samat is  NNE of the Mariveles caldera. The Mount Samat Cross is situated near the edge of the crater rim.

Historical significance

At the start of World War II in 1942 after suffering heavy losses against the Imperial Japanese Army all over Luzon, the Filipino and American soldiers retreated to Bataan Peninsula to regroup for a last valiant but futile stand. After four months of fighting, the 78,000 exhausted, sick and starving soldiers under Major General Edward P. King surrendered to the Japanese on April 9, 1942 known as the fall of Bataan. It is the single largest surrender of U.S. soldiers in history and Mariveles, a town in the Bataan province, was their last stronghold after which, together with the Philippine soldiers, they were led on to the  march to Capas, Tarlac known as the Bataan Death March.

The Mount Samat National Shrine was erected as a memorial to the Filipino and American soldiers who fought against the Imperial Japanese Army in World War II.

Dunsulan Falls
Dunsulan Falls is a waterfall located at the foot of Mount Samat, northeast of the National Shrine in Brgy Liyang, also in Pilar town. Dunsulan falls and river is the main drainage on the crater side of Mount Samat.

Images

References

External links

 Photo of Dunsulan Falls from Panoramio

Landforms of Bataan
Mountains of the Philippines
Volcanoes of Luzon
Parasitic cones